Arnutovce is a village and municipality in the Spišská Nová Ves District in the Košice Region of central-eastern Slovakia.

History
In historical records the village was first mentioned in 1317.

Geography
It has a population of about 605 people.

Ethnicity
The village is about 70% Slovak and 30% Gypsy.

Facilities
The village has a public library and a football pitch.

Genealogical resources

The records for genealogical research are available at the state archive "Statny Archiv in Levoca, Slovakia"

 Roman Catholic church records (births/marriages/deaths): 1760-1901
 Greek Catholic church records (births/marriages/deaths): 1784-1895
 Census records 1869 of Arnutovce are available at the state archive.

See also
 List of municipalities and towns in Slovakia

External links
http://en.e-obce.sk/obec/arnutovce/arnutovce.html
https://www.webcitation.org/5QjNYnAux?url=http://www.statistics.sk/mosmis/eng/run.html
Surnames of living people in Arnutovce
http://www.arnutovce.ocu.sk

Villages and municipalities in Spišská Nová Ves District